George Peebles (22 January 1936 – 16 October 2016) was a Scottish football player and manager.  He played for Dunfermline Athletic for most of his career, helping the club win the 1960–61 Scottish Cup. Peebles provided an assist for the first Dunfermline goal in their cup final victory against Celtic. He moved to Stirling Albion in 1966 for a £4000 transfer fee.

Peebles later became a coach, managing Stirling Albion between 1986 and 1988. He had previously served as an assistant to Alex Smith, taking over when Smith moved to St Mirren. Peebles then coached players at St Johnstone on a part-time basis, while also working as a painter and decorator.

References

1936 births
2016 deaths
Scottish footballers
Scottish Football League players
Scottish Football League managers
Dunfermline Athletic F.C. players
Stirling Albion F.C. players
Scottish football managers
Stirling Albion F.C. managers
Association football wingers
Dunipace F.C. players
St Johnstone F.C. non-playing staff